People Die for Metal is a 1919 silent film directed by Alexandre Volkoff.

Plot 
The film tells about a millionaire Gornostaev and ballerina Ilona, who cannot agree on the opinion what is more important - beauty and youth or money. Gornostaev gives a promise to Ilona for two years to prove that wealth is more important.

Starring 
 Zoya Karabanova
 Iona Talanov	
 Yuri Yurovsky	
 Nicolas Rimsky	
 Elizaveta Valerskaya	
 Olga Kondorova
 Klein		
 Popov

References

External links 

1918 films
1910s Russian-language films
Russian silent films
Russian black-and-white films